The 1st Minnesota Legislature first convened on December 2, 1857. The 37 members of the Minnesota Senate and the 80 members of the Minnesota House of Representatives were elected during the General Election of October 13, 1857. Although the Constitution of the State of Minnesota, which had been adopted by the voters at the 1857 general election, was not ratified by the United States Senate until May 11, 1858, this was the first legislature of the State of Minnesota to convene in conformity with the state constitution.

Sessions 
The legislature met in a regular session from December 2, 1857 to August 12, 1858, with a recess between March 25, 1858 and June 2, 1858. There were no special sessions; however, the regular session continued for 254 days, which still ranks the longest duration of any Minnesota Legislature. Due to the protracted length of the 1857-58 session, it was determined that an 1858-59 meeting of the legislature was unnecessary, and the 2nd Minnesota Legislature did not convene until December 1859.

Party summary 
Resignations and new members are discussed in the "Membership changes" section, below.

Senate

House of Representatives

Leadership

Senate 
Lieutenant Governor
Since June 3, 1858 William Holcombe (D-Stillwater)

President of the Senate
Until June 3, 1858 Richard G. Murphy (D-Shakopee)

House of Representatives 
Speaker of the House
Until March 12, 1858 John S. Watrous (D-Clifton)
Since March 12, 1858 George Bradley (D-Belle Plaine)

Speaker Pro Tempore
December 22, 1857 to March 12, 1858 George Bradley (D-Belle Plaine)

Members

Senate

House of Representatives

Membership changes

House of Representatives

Notes

References 

 Minnesota Legislators Past & Present - Session Search Results (Session 1, Senate)
 Minnesota Legislators Past & Present - Session Search Results (Session 1, House)

01st
1850s in Minnesota
1857 establishments in Minnesota Territory